Ubierring is a station on the Cologne Stadtbahn lines 15 and 16, located in the Cologne district of Neustadt-Süd. The station lies on Ubierring (part of the Cologne Ring), after which it is named. 

The station was opened by the Bonn–Cologne Railway Company in 1905 and consists of two side platforms with two rail tracks.

See also 
 List of Cologne KVB stations

External links 
 station info page 

Cologne KVB stations
Innenstadt, Cologne
Railway stations in Germany opened in 1905